John Arundell of Trerice (1613–1644) was a landowner from Cornwall who sat in the House of Commons from 1640 to 1644. He supported the Royalist cause during the First English Civil War and was killed during the Siege of Plymouth in November 1644.

Personal details
John Arundell was born around 1613 in Trerice, Cornwall, eldest son of Sir John Arundell (1576-1656) and his wife Mary Cary, daughter of George Cary of Clovelley. He was one of six children, the others being Richard, William (died 1643), Francis, Agnes and Mary (1625-1701).  The Arundells of Trerice were a junior branch of a Catholic family spread throughout Cornwall, the wealthiest and most significant being the Arundells of St Mawgan.

Career

In November, Arundell was elected Member of Parliament for Bodmin; like other Cornish MPs, he consistently supported the Crown and in May 1641 was one of 59 members named as "betrayers of their country" for voting against the Bill of Attainder for Strafford. Those who voted against the Bill included Sidney Godolphin, John Trevanion, and Nicholas Slanning, all of whom would later be killed fighting for the Royalists. 

His movements during the First English Civil War are unclear until he joined the Oxford Parliament in January 1644, when he was disabled from sitting at Westminster"for deserting the service of the House, being in the king's quarters, and adhering that party". He raised a regiment of cavalry which served in the West Country and was killed in a skirmish outside Plymouth in November 1644.

References

Sources
 
 
 

Brunton, D. & Pennington, D. H. (1954) Members of the Long Parliament. London: George Allen & Unwin
Cobbett, William (1808) Cobbett's Parliamentary history of England, from the Norman Conquest in 1066 to the year 1803. London: Thomas Hansard

1613 births
1644 deaths
People from St Mawgan
Members of the Parliament of England for Bodmin
English MPs 1640–1648
Cavaliers
Royalist military personnel of the English Civil War
People killed in the English Civil War
Military personnel from Cornwall